Elena Gadel (born 12 November 1982) is a Spanish singer.

She placed eleventh in Operacion Triunfo 2. Her debut single in 2002, Es Por Ti, claimed the number four slot on the Spanish charts, and in 2003, she had success in the pop group Lunae. In 2005, she starred in the Catalan musical Mar i Cel, for which she was awarded best actress at the Spanish Theatre Awards.

Discography

 2003: Es Por Ti
 2011: Tocant Fusta

References

1982 births
Living people
Musicians from Catalonia
21st-century Spanish singers
21st-century Spanish women singers